Jonathan William Rossiter Sinclair  (born 13 October 1970) is a British diplomat who is Director of Human Resources at the Foreign and Commonwealth Office.

Career
Sinclair was educated at Radley College and studied at Oxford University for a BA degree in PPE and at Johns Hopkins University for a Master's degree in International Relations. After short stints in media and tourism he joined the Foreign and Commonwealth Office in 1996. He was a Private Secretary to the Foreign Secretary (then Jack Straw) 2002–04, and head of the political team at the British embassy in Washington, D.C., 2005–09. He was High Commissioner to New Zealand, non-resident High Commissioner to Samoa, and non-resident Governor of the Pitcairn, Henderson, Ducie and Oeno Islands 2014–18.

Sinclair was appointed LVO in 2007 following a state visit by The Queen to the United States.

References

1970 births
Living people
Alumni of the University of Oxford
Johns Hopkins University alumni
Governors of Pitcairn
High Commissioners of the United Kingdom to New Zealand
High Commissioners of the United Kingdom to Samoa
Principal Private Secretaries to the Secretary of State for Foreign and Commonwealth Affairs
Lieutenants of the Royal Victorian Order